Phytocoris is a genus of plant bugs belonging to the family Miridae.

Species
Species within this genus include:

 Phytocoris acaciae
 Phytocoris adenostomae
 Phytocoris adustus
 Phytocoris aesculinus
 Phytocoris alamogordo
 Phytocoris albellus
 Phytocoris albicuneatus
 Phytocoris albidopictus
 Phytocoris albidosquamus
 Phytocoris albifacies
 Phytocoris albifrons
 Phytocoris albitylus
 Phytocoris alboscutellatus
 Phytocoris alpestris
 Phytocoris alpinus
 Phytocoris americanus
 Phytocoris angustatus
 Phytocoris angusticollis
 Phytocoris angustifrons
 Phytocoris annulicornis
 Phytocoris antennalis
 Phytocoris apache
 Phytocoris argus
 Phytocoris aridus
 Phytocoris arizonensis
 Phytocoris arundinicola
 Phytocoris atriscutum
 Phytocoris auranti
 Phytocoris aurora
 Phytocoris avius
 Phytocoris baboquivari
 Phytocoris bakeri
 Phytocoris balli
 Phytocoris beameri
 Phytocoris becki
 Phytocoris belfragei
 Phytocoris berbericola
 Phytocoris bituberis
 Phytocoris biumbonatus
 Phytocoris borealis
 Phytocoris borregoi
 Phytocoris breviatus
 Phytocoris brevicornis
 Phytocoris brevifurcatus
 Phytocoris brevisetosus
 Phytocoris breviusculus
 Phytocoris brimleyi
 Phytocoris brooksi
 Phytocoris broweri
 Phytocoris buenoi
 Phytocoris californicus
 Phytocoris calli
 Phytocoris calvus
 Phytocoris canadensis
 Phytocoris candidus
 Phytocoris canescens
 Phytocoris carnosulus
 Phytocoris caryae
 Phytocoris catalinae
 Phytocoris ceanoticus
 Phytocoris cercocarpi
 Phytocoris chemehuevi
 Phytocoris chihuahuanae
 Phytocoris cienega
 Phytocoris cinereus
 Phytocoris cochise
 Phytocoris commissuralis
 Phytocoris comulus
 Phytocoris confluens
 Phytocoris coniferales
 Phytocoris consors
 Phytocoris conspersipes
 Phytocoris conspicuus
 Phytocoris conspurcatus
 Phytocoris coronadoi
 Phytocoris corticevivens
 Phytocoris corticola
 Phytocoris cortitectus
 Phytocoris cowaniae
 Phytocoris crawfordi
 Phytocoris cunealis
 Phytocoris cuneotinctus
 Phytocoris davisi
 Phytocoris decorus
 Phytocoris decurvatus
 Phytocoris dentatus
 Phytocoris denticulatus
 Phytocoris depictus
 Phytocoris deserticola
 Phytocoris desertinus
 Phytocoris difficilis
 Phytocoris difformis
 Phytocoris dimidiatus
 Phytocoris diversus
 Phytocoris dreisbachi
 Phytocoris dumicola
 Phytocoris ejuncidus
 Phytocoris electilis
 Phytocoris empirensis
 Phytocoris erectus
 Phytocoris eurekae
 Phytocoris exemplus
 Phytocoris eximius
 Phytocoris falcatus
 Phytocoris fenestratus
 Phytocoris formosus
 Phytocoris fraterculus
 Phytocoris fulvipennis
 Phytocoris fulvus
 Phytocoris fumatus
 Phytocoris fuscipennis
 Phytocoris fuscosignatus
 Phytocoris geniculatus
 Phytocoris guadalupe
 Phytocoris heidemanni
 Phytocoris hettenshawi
 Phytocoris hirsuticus
 Phytocoris hirtus
 Phytocoris hispidus
 Phytocoris histriculus
 Phytocoris hopi
 Phytocoris huachuca
 Phytocoris hualapai
 Phytocoris husseyi
 Phytocoris hyampom
 Phytocoris hypoleucoides
 Phytocoris imperialensis
 Phytocoris infuscatus
 Phytocoris ingens
 Phytocoris inops
 Phytocoris insulatus
 Phytocoris intermontanus
 Phytocoris interspersus
 Phytocoris intricatus
 Phytocoris jucundus
 Phytocoris juliae
 Phytocoris junceus
 Phytocoris juniperanus
 Phytocoris junipericola
 Phytocoris kahtahbi
 Phytocoris kerrvillensis
 Phytocoris ketinelbi
 Phytocoris kiowa
 Phytocoris knowltoni
 Phytocoris kuschei
 Phytocoris lacunosus
 Phytocoris laevis
 Phytocoris lasiomerus
 Phytocoris laticeps
 Phytocoris latisquamus
 Phytocoris lattini
 Phytocoris leucophaeus
 Phytocoris lineatus
 Phytocoris listi
 Phytocoris longihirtus
 Phytocoris luteolus
 Phytocoris lycii
 Phytocoris maricopae
 Phytocoris maritimus
 Phytocoris megatuberis
 Phytocoris mellarius
 Phytocoris mesillae
 Phytocoris michiganae
 Phytocoris microfascinum
 Phytocoris miniatus
 Phytocoris minituberculatus
 Phytocoris minuendus
 Phytocoris minutulus
 Phytocoris mirus
 Phytocoris monophyllae
 Phytocoris mundus
 Phytocoris navajo
 Phytocoris neglectus
 Phytocoris nicholi
 Phytocoris nigricollis
 Phytocoris nigrifrons
 Phytocoris nigrisignatus
 Phytocoris nigrisquamus
 Phytocoris nigrolineatus
 Phytocoris nobilis
 Phytocoris obscuratus
 Phytocoris obtectus
 Phytocoris occidentalis
 Phytocoris olseni
 Phytocoris omani
 Phytocoris onustus
 Phytocoris oppositus
 Phytocoris osage
 Phytocoris osborni
 Phytocoris pallidicornis
 Phytocoris pallidilineatus
 Phytocoris pectinatus
 Phytocoris piceicola
 Phytocoris pini
 Phytocoris pinicola
 Phytocoris pintoi
 Phytocoris planituberis
 Phytocoris plenus
 Phytocoris pleuroimos
 Phytocoris polhemusi
 Phytocoris politus
 Phytocoris populi
 Phytocoris praealtus
 Phytocoris presidio
 Phytocoris proctori
 Phytocoris pseudonymus
 Phytocoris puella
 Phytocoris pulchellus
 Phytocoris pulchricollis
 Phytocoris purshiae
 Phytocoris purvus
 Phytocoris quadriannulipes
 Phytocoris quercicola
 Phytocoris quercinus
 Phytocoris radiatae
 Phytocoris rainieri
 Phytocoris ramosus
 Phytocoris ravidus
 Phytocoris relativus
 Phytocoris reticulatus
 Phytocoris reuteri
 Phytocoris rolfsi
 Phytocoris roseipennis
 Phytocoris roseotinctus
 Phytocoris roseus
 Phytocoris rosillos
 Phytocoris rostratus
 Phytocoris rubellus
 Phytocoris rubrimaculatus
 Phytocoris rubrocuneatus
 Phytocoris rubroornatus
 Phytocoris rubropictus
 Phytocoris rufoscriptus
 Phytocoris rufus
 Phytocoris sacramento
 Phytocoris sagax
 Phytocoris salicis
 Phytocoris sanbernardino
 Phytocoris sangabriel
 Phytocoris sanjoaquin
 Phytocoris schaffneri
 Phytocoris schotti
 Phytocoris schuhi
 Phytocoris schuylkillensis
 Phytocoris schwarzi
 Phytocoris seminotatus
 Phytocoris sewardi
 Phytocoris shoshoni
 Phytocoris signatipes
 Phytocoris simulatus
 Phytocoris solano
 Phytocoris sonorensis
 Phytocoris spicatus
 Phytocoris squamosus
 Phytocoris stellatus
 Phytocoris stitti
 Phytocoris strigosus
 Phytocoris suavis
 Phytocoris sublineatus
 Phytocoris sulcatus
 Phytocoris taxodii
 Phytocoris tehachapi
 Phytocoris tenerum
 Phytocoris tenuis
 Phytocoris texanus
 Phytocoris tibialis
 Phytocoris tiliae
 Phytocoris tillandsiae
 Phytocoris tobrendae
 Phytocoris torridus
 Phytocoris tricinctipes
 Phytocoris tricinctus
 Phytocoris tuberculatus
 Phytocoris tucki
 Phytocoris tumidifrons
 Phytocoris ulmi
 Phytocoris umbrosus
 Phytocoris uniformis
 Phytocoris usingeri
 Phytocoris utahensis
 Phytocoris validus
 Phytocoris vanduzeei
 Phytocoris varipes
 Phytocoris varius
 Phytocoris vau
 Phytocoris ventralis
 Phytocoris venustus
 Phytocoris vinaceus
 Phytocoris viridescens
 Phytocoris yavapai
 Phytocoris yollabollae
 Phytocoris yuma
 Phytocoris yuroki

References

 
Miridae genera
Mirini